, provisional designation , is a sub-kilometer near-Earth asteroid in the dynamical Apollo asteroid group, discovered by Spacewatch at Kitt Peak National Observatory, Arizona, on 29 March 2006. It is a quasi-satellite of Earth. It is also notable for having a low delta-v requirement for rendezvous. Although its orbital period is almost exactly 1 year, the orbit of  has a high eccentricity which causes it to cross the paths of both Venus and Mars.

Transfer energy 
With a semi-major axis of almost exactly 1 astronomical unit,  has a relatively low transfer energy from Earth. The delta-v required to transfer to the asteroid varies between 11 and 13 km/s; this change in delta-v oscillates over an approximately 200-year period with the current transfer cost near its maximum of 13 km/s.

See also

References

External links 
 MPEC 2006-F58, Minor Planet Electronic Circular
 
 
 

277810
277810
277810
277810
277810
20060329